Geoff Smith is a former member of the Ohio House of Representatives, representing the western part of Columbus from 1999 to 2006. Originally appointed, he went on to win re-election in 2000, 2002, and 2004 until he was defeated in the 2006 general election by Ted Celeste.

References

Peace Corps volunteers
Members of the Ohio House of Representatives
Ohio Democrats
Living people
Ohio Republicans
Year of birth missing (living people)
21st-century American politicians